Live at the Corner is a live album by Australian alternative rockers Something for Kate. It was produced by Peter Frawley, recorded and mixed by Sam Lowe for release on the same evening it was recorded. Justine Cleghorn of FasterLouder described it as an "Artist Controlled Bootleg", which captured the band's performance on 23 February 2008 at the Corner Hotel in Richmond. The limited release was also available at the following night's performance.

Track listing 

All tracks written by Stephanie Ashworth, Paul Dempsey and Clint Hyndman, unless otherwise noted.
 "Stunt Show" (3:37)
 "Prick" (4:25)
 "Big Screen Television" (4:37)
 "California" (4:02)
 "Old Pictures" (4:02)
 "Pinstripe" (3:34)
 "Chapel St." (6:35)
 "The Astronaut" (3:53)
 "Deja Vu" (3:29)
 "Back to You" (4:25)
 "Reverse Soundtrack" (4:45)
 "Ship of Fools" (Karl Wallinger) (4:54)
 "This Is the Life for Me" (4:16)
 "Down the Garden Path" (6:04)
 "Monsters" (4:13)
 "The Futurist" (4:33)

Personnel 

Something for Kate
 Stephanie Ashworth: – bass guitar
 Paul Dempsey: – vocals, guitar
 Clint Hyndman: – drums

Additional musicians
 Pip Branson: – guitar, violin, glockenspiel

Recording details
 Producer: – Peter Frawley
 Audio engineer: – Sean McVitty
 Mixing engineer: – Sam Lowe
 Assistant mixing engineer: – Gene Shev

References 

Something for Kate albums
2008 live albums